Yuri Makoveychuk (born 1961) is an artist-painter and filmmaker working in the rare field of mannequin animation.

Biography
Makoveychuk was born in Kyiv, Ukraine in 1961. He moved to Philadelphia in 1990, and later to New York City. He studied art at the Shevchenko State Art School in Kyiv (his classmates there also included Roman Turovsky and Alina Panova). He continued his art studies at the Kyiv State Art Academy (BFA), and the Art Institute of Philadelphia (MFA).

Career

Painter
 "Designing Intelligence" Exhibition (Florida Atlantic University ).

Film-maker
Makoveychuk produced two animated feature films, "Radioman" (1999) and "The Institute" (2003). Eventually "Radioman"  won the Parma festival of animation prize.

Scenographer
Makoveychuk participated (in the capacity of a production designer) in many independent film and television productions in Europe, notably in 2008 Norwegian film "ICEKISS", as well as the "Three Musqueteers" and "Twelve Chairs", as well as the sets for the Maria Burmaka and Verka Serdyuchka performances. He also has been active as a scenic artist ("Great Expectations", "Godzilla", "As Good As It Gets", "DeviI's Advocate" et al.

Filmography
 Radioman (1999)
 The Institute (2003)

References

official site

External links
official site
 http://theartblog.org/2008/11/silent-mayhem-at-heaven%E2%80%99s-gate/
 http://culturemob.com/events/5634405-yuri-makoveychuk-heavens-gate-pa-philadelphia-poplar-ludlow-yorktowne-19123-cerulean-arts
 https://uk.imdb.com/name/nm1940537/filmotype 
 http://www.artfacts.net/index.php/pageType/exhibitionInfo/exhibition/112869/lang/
 http://tuftsjournal.tufts.edu/archive/2007/december/calendar/index.shtml

1961 births
20th-century American painters
American male painters
21st-century American painters
21st-century American male artists
Living people
Film people from Kyiv
20th-century Ukrainian painters
20th-century Ukrainian male artists
American animators
American animated film directors
Ukrainian animated film directors
Shevchenko State Art School alumni
Ukrainian SSR emigrants to the United States
Ukrainian male painters
20th-century American male artists